Frank Bare may refer to:

Frank Bare Sr. (1930–2011), American gymnast and co-founder of USA Gymnastics
Frank Bare Jr., American freestyle skier of the 1970s and 1980s